Monoamine activity enhancers (MAE), also known as catecholaminergic/serotoninergic activity enhancers, are a class neuro-biologically active compounds that enhance the release of monoamines in the nervous system. Monoamine activity enhancers are distinct from monoamine releasing agents in that they do not cause the release of monoamines from synaptic vesicles but rather potentiate impulse-evoked monoamine-release. Monoamine activity enhancers increase the number of monoamines released per electrical impulse received.

Endogenous monoamine activity enhancers 
Monoamine activity enhancers can possess selectivity for enhancing the release of a certain monoamine over others. For example, the endogenous monoamine activity enhancer phenylethylamine (PEA) is roughly 100x more selective for potentiating dopamine release over serotonin release. The monoamine potentiating effects of PEA are distinct from its monoamine releasing properties, which only present at high concentrations.  Conversely, another endogenous monoamine activity enhancer, tryptamine, appears to selectively potentiate serotonin release over dopamine release.

Monoamine activity enhancing drugs 
The Parkinson's disease drug selegiline (a phenylethylamine derivative) exhibits monoamine activity enhancing effects independent of its MAO inhibiting action.

Mechanism of action 
The mechanism of action of monoamine activity enhancers may be explained by their shared affinities for the trace amine 1 receptor.

List of monoamine activity enhancers 

 Phenylethylamine
 BPAP
 PPAP
 Selegiline
 Tryptamine

References 

Neurophysiology